Tamariz de Campos is a municipality located in the province of Valladolid, Castile and León, Spain. According to the 2014 census (INE), the municipality has a population of 69.

References

External links
Tamariz de Campos. Description, history and pictures

Municipalities in the Province of Valladolid